Zastawie  is a village in the administrative district of Gmina Zbiczno, within Brodnica County, Kuyavian-Pomeranian Voivodeship, in north-central Poland.

The village has a population of 170.

References

Zastawie